Éloi Machoro (January 1949 –  12 January 1985) was a New Caledonian Kanak separatist politician.

Career
Machoro was born in Nakety in January 1949. He held several jobs, including clerk, farm worker, miner and a teacher in a primary school.

After being elected assistant general secretary of the Caledonian Union in 1977, he contested the East constituency in the elections that year and was elected to the Territorial Assembly, and was re-elected in 1979 when the party ran as part of the Independence Front. Following the assassination of Pierre Declercq on 19 September 1981, Machoro became the party's general secretary. He and other separatist militants went to Libya.

The Kanak and Socialist National Liberation Front (FLNKS) was formed in September 1984 as a replacement for the Independence Front, boycotting the elections in November. On 1 December Jean-Marie Tjibaou declared the formation of a provisional government of Kanak Socialist Republic, with Machoro as Minister of Security. As a result, he became the leader of the independents' armed forces. He disarmed the gendarmes of Thio, and gained control over the village without violence. On 11 January 1985 Yves Tual, the son of a European stockbreeder, was killed by independentist militants at La Foa. These events triggered a series of nighttime rebellions. On 12 January, the gendarmes started an operation to free the house of a European in Canala that the FLNKS had occupied under the leadership of Machoro. The FLNKS occupants eventually fled to a farmhouse, where the gendarmes caught them. Machoro and  Marcel Nonaro were killed during the ensuing action. The gendarmes left Machoro in pain for hours to die without giving him help.

References

1949 births
Kanak people
New Caledonian educators
Caledonian Union politicians
Members of the Congress of New Caledonia
People from South Province, New Caledonia
1985 deaths